Eleanor of Aragon (20 February 1358 – 13 August 1382) was a daughter of King Peter IV of Aragon and his wife Eleanor of Sicily. She was a member of the House of Barcelona and Queen of Castile by her marriage.

Family
Eleanor was the youngest child and only daughter of her father by his third marriage. Eleanor was a sister of John I of Aragon and Martin of Aragon. She was a half-sister of Constance, Queen of Sicily, Joanna, Countess of Ampurias and Isabella, Countess of Urgell.

Marriage 
At Soria on the 18 June 1375, Eleanor married John I of Castile. Her marriage was arranged as part of the arrangements for peace between Aragon and Castile agreed at Almazán on the 12 April 1374 and at Lleida on the 10 May 1375.

Eleanor and John were married for seven years, in which time they had three children:
Henry (4 October 1379 – 25 December 1406), succeeded his father as King of Castile
Ferdinand (27 November 1380 – 2 April 1416), became King of Aragon in 1412
Eleanor (b. 13 August 1382), died young

After seven years of marriage on 13 August 1382, Eleanor died giving birth to her daughter and namesake Eleanor, who died young. Eleanor's son Ferdinand later claimed his mother's rights on the Kingdom of Aragon when both of Eleanor's brothers died without surviving sons.

References

Sources

 cites:

|-

1358 births
1382 deaths
House of Trastámara
Castilian queen consorts
Leonese queen consorts
Galician queens consort
14th-century Castilians
Aragonese infantas
Deaths in childbirth
14th-century Spanish women
14th-century people from the Kingdom of Aragon
Daughters of kings